Leonorilda Ochoa Pagaza (30 October 1938 – 22 May 2016) was a Mexican actress and comedian who appeared in film since the Golden Age of Mexican cinema, television, and theatre productions. She became popular as La Pecas in the sitcom Los Beverly de Peralvillo (1968-1973).

Early life
Ochoa was born in Mexico City, the fourth of five children. Her father, Rubén Ochoa Silva, was a violinist and bassist who played in the philharmonic orchestra of Mexico City. She made her debut at the age of 14 in various broadcasts of Los aficionados, a program which was broadcast by the XEW radio station. She also studied accounting for two years.

Career
One of her first professional jobs was as the showgirl for the Quinteto de los Hermanos Salinas. She then appeared in the pioneering television programs Variedades del mediodía (1954), starring Manuel "El Loco" Valdés, and Cómicos y canciones (1956), starring Viruta and Capulina. Her breakthrough in television came in the sitcom Chucherías (1962), which also starred Chucho Salinas, Héctor Lechuga, and Alejandro Suárez. However, her most successful television role is that of La Pecas, the wife of Guillermo Rivas' character, in Los Beverly de Peralvillo, a sitcom about a large family.

In 1967, she was nominated for the Silver Goddess Award for Best Supporting Actress for Despedida de soltera (1966). She starred opposite Gaspar Henaine in Capulina Speedy González (1970). She also reprised her role of La Pecas in the films Los Beverly de Peralvillo (1971) and Que familia tan cotorra! (1973) and the sitcom Los nuevos Beverlys (1996).

Her last appearances were in the telenovelas Rubí (2004) and Código postal (2006-2007). She died of Alzheimer's disease at the age of 78 in 2016.

Filmography

Film
 El dengue del amor (1965)
 La alegría de vivir (1965) - Lupe
 Despedida de soltera (1966) - Laura
 Amor a ritmo de go go (1966) - Leonor
 Los años verdes (1967)
 Novias impacientes (1967) - Rosita
 Caballos de acero (1967)
 Amor en las nubes (1968)
 Muñecas peligrosas (1969) - Leonor
 Con licencia para matar (1969) - Leonor
 Romance sobre ruedas (1969)
 Cazadores de espías (1969) - Leonorilda Ochoa
 Capulina Speedy Gonzalez (1970) - Rosita Smith
 La mujer de oro (1970)
 Los Beverly de Peralvillo (1971) - La Pecas
 La cigueña si es un bicho (1971)
 Que familia tan cotorra! (1973) - La Pecas
 Cinco nacos asaltan Las Vegas (1987)
 Raptola, violola y matola (1989)
 Oficio: Golfa (1990)
 No tan virgen (1991)
 Abuelita de Bakman (1993) - Esposa Politico
 El superman... Dilon (1993)

Television
 Los Beverly de Peralvillo (1968-1973) - La Pecas
 Alcanzar una estrella (1991) - Soledad 'Chole' Patiño
 Mujer, casos de la vida real  (1997-2003)
 Vivo por Elena (1998) - Aurora
 Rubí (2004) - Dolores Herrera Guzmán'Doña Lola'
 Código postal (2006-2007) - Chuyita (final appearance)

References

External links

1937 births
2016 deaths
Mexican film actresses
Mexican television actresses
Mexican telenovela actresses
Mexican stage actresses
Mexican women comedians
Actresses from Mexico City
Deaths from dementia in Mexico
Deaths from Alzheimer's disease